Coccotrypes cyperi, commonly known as seed borer, is a species of weevil with a cosmopolitan distribution.

Distribution
Native range of the species is South east Asia. It is found in Myanmar, India, China, Indonesia, Malaysia, Sri Lanka, Vietnam, Sweden, Seychelles, Costa Rica, Honduras, Panamá, Jamaica, Lesser Antilles, Puerto Rico, Dominican Republic, México, United States, Australia, Cook Islands, Fiji, French Polynesia, Micronesia, Samoa, Tonga, New Zealand, Papua New Guinea, Bolivia, Brazil, Ecuador, Chile, Peru, Saint Vicente and the Grenadines, Saint Lucia, US Virgin Islands, Suriname and Trinidad and Tobago.

It is introduced to USA in the early 1900s particularly due to imported bird seeds and avocado seeds.

Biology
After mating, adult beetle breeds in fruits, seeds, petioles, phloem, twigs, under bark of branches and logs. Particularly a seed borer, grubs are bore into the soft tissues. Both adult and the larva are polyphagous and has been reported from about 50 host plant species. In 2013 and 2015, it has been intercepted, in Cyprus on plants for planting of Ficus microcarpa from China.

Host plants

 Aesculus punchuana
 Aglaia spectabilis
 Apeiba tibourbou
 Artocarpus lacucha
 Attalea vitrivir
 Bombax ceiba
 Borassus flabellifer
 Calophyllum inophyllum
 Calophyllum calaba
 Canarium strictum
 Carallia brachiata
 Cassia arabica
 Cecropia insignis
 Cecropia obtusifolia
 Cecropia peltata
 Ceiba pentandra
 Coffea
 Cynometra hemitomophylla
 Dipterocarpus retusus
 Elaeocarpus oblongus
 Eschweilera biflava
 Eugenia formosa
 Euterpe oleracea
 Ficus glomerata
 Ficus retusa
 Gluta travancorica
 Gustavia brachycarpa
 Lonchocarpus macrophyllus
 Luehea seemannii
 Macadamia indica
 Macaranga denticulata
 Mammea americana
 Mangifera indica
 Myrica gale
 Oenocarpus bataua
 Pentadesma butyracea
 Persea americana
 Phytelephas macrocarpa
 Pinus caribaea
 Pinus kesiya
 Pouteria multiflora
 Pronia copaifer
 Rhizophora mangle
 Sandoricum koetjape
 Scheelea bassleriana
 Sloanea berteroana
 Spondias mombin
 Swietenia macrophylla
 Swintonia floribunda
 Terminalia myriocarpa
 Theobroma cacao
 Vateria indica
 Xylia xylocarpa

References

Curculionidae
Insects of Sri Lanka
Insects described in 1929